St Paul's Churchyard is an area immediately around St Paul's Cathedral in the City of London. It included St Paul's Cross and Paternoster Row. It became one of the principal marketplaces in London. St Paul's Cross was an open-air pulpit from which many of the most important statements on the political and religious changes brought by the Reformation were made public during the sixteenth and seventeenth centuries. Only one execution is recorded as taking place in St Paul's Churchyard; that of Henry Garnet, one of those found guilty of the Gunpowder plot.

Book trade
With the advent of printing, St Paul's Churchyard  quickly became the centre of the book trade in England (later moving to nearby Paternoster Row). Originally it was dominated by foreign booksellers. Richard III's only parliament of 1484 passed the act which encouraged them to do business in London. Despite other protectionist measures, the king personally intervened that printers and booksellers were exempt from these.

It was also referenced by Alexander Pope in a famous passage from An Essay on Criticism, lines 622–625:

References

Churchyards in London
History of printing